Government Institute of Science, Aurangabad, is a postgraduate and research institute situated in Aurangabad, Maharashtra. It was established in the year 1974. This institute is affiliated with Dr. Babasaheb Ambedkar Marathwada University.

Departments
Biophysics
Biotechnology
Botany
Geology
Microbiology

Accreditation
The college is  recognized by the University Grants Commission (UGC).

References

External links

Dr. Babasaheb Ambedkar Marathwada University
Universities and colleges in Maharashtra
Educational institutions established in 1974
1974 establishments in Maharashtra